The carrying capacity of an environment is the maximum population size of a biological species that can be sustained by that specific environment, given the food, habitat, water, and other resources available. The carrying capacity is defined as the environment's maximal load, which in population ecology corresponds to the population equilibrium, when the number of deaths in a population equals the number of births (as well as immigration and emigration). The effect of carrying capacity on population dynamics is modelled with a logistic function. Carrying capacity is applied to the maximum population an environment can support in ecology, agriculture and fisheries. The term carrying capacity has been applied to a few different processes in the past before finally being applied to population limits in the 1950s. The notion of carrying capacity for humans is covered by the notion of sustainable population.

At the global scale, scientific data indicates that humans are living beyond the carrying capacity of planet Earth and that this cannot continue indefinitely. This scientific evidence comes from many sources. It was presented in detail in the Millennium Ecosystem Assessment of 2005, a collaborative effort involving more than 1,360 experts worldwide. More recent, detailed accounts are provided by ecological footprint accounting, and interdisciplinary research on planetary boundaries to safe human use of the biosphere. The Sixth Assessment Report on Climate Change from the IPCC and the First Assessment Report on Biodiversity and Ecosystem Services by the IPBES, large international summaries of the state of scientific knowledge regarding climate disruption and biodiversity loss, also support this view.

An early detailed examination of global limits was published in the 1972 book Limits to Growth, which has prompted follow-up commentary and analysis. A 2012 review in Nature by 22 international researchers expressed concerns that the Earth may be "approaching a state shift" in which the biosphere may become less hospitable to human life and in which human carrying capacity may diminish. This concern that humanity may be passing beyond "tipping points" for safe use of the biosphere has increased in subsequent years. Recent estimates of Earth's carrying capacity run between two to four billion people, depending on how optimistic researchers are about international cooperation to solve collective action problems. These estimates affirm that the more people we seek to sustain, the more modest their average standard of living needs to be.

Origins
In terms of population dynamics, the term 'carrying capacity' was not explicitly used in 1838 by the Belgian mathematician Pierre François Verhulst when he first published his equations based on research on modelling population growth.

The origins of the term "carrying capacity" are uncertain, with sources variously stating that it was originally used "in the context of international shipping" in the 1840s, or that it was first used during 19th-century laboratory experiments with micro-organisms. A 2008 review finds the first use of the term in English was an 1845 report by the US Secretary of State to the US Senate. It then became a term used generally in biology in the 1870s, being most developed in wildlife and livestock management in the early 1900s. It had become a staple term in ecology used to define the biological limits of a natural system related to population size in the 1950s.

Neo-Malthusians and eugenicists popularised the use of the words to describe the number of people the Earth can support in the 1950s, although American biostatisticians Raymond Pearl and Lowell Reed had already applied it in these terms to human populations in the 1920s.

Hadwen and Palmer (1923) defined carrying capacity as the density of stock that could be grazed for a definite period without damage to the range.

It was first used in the context of wildlife management by the American Aldo Leopold in 1933, and a year later by the American Paul Lester Errington, a wetlands specialist. They used the term in different ways, Leopold largely in the sense of grazing animals (differentiating between a 'saturation level', an intrinsic level of density a species would live in, and carrying capacity, the most animals which could be in the field) and Errington defining 'carrying capacity' as the number of animals above which predation would become 'heavy' (this definition has largely been rejected, including by Errington himself). The important and popular 1953 textbook on ecology by Eugene Odum, Fundamentals of Ecology, popularised the term in its modern meaning as the equilibrium value of the logistic model of population growth.

Mathematics
The specific reason why a population stops growing is known as a limiting or regulating factor.

The difference between the birth rate and the death rate is the natural increase. If the population of a given organism is below the carrying capacity of a given environment, this environment could support a positive natural increase; should it find itself above that threshold the population typically decreases. Thus, the carrying capacity is the maximum number of individuals of a species that an environment can support.

Population size decreases above carrying capacity due to a range of factors depending on the species concerned, but can include insufficient space, food supply, or sunlight. The carrying capacity of an environment varies for different species.

In the standard ecological algebra as illustrated in the simplified Verhulst model of population dynamics, carrying capacity is represented by the constant K:

 

where

  is the population size,
  is the intrinsic growth rate
  is the carrying capacity of the local environment, and

(Note that decrease is negative growth.) The choice of the letter  came from the German Kapazitätsgrenze (capacity limit).

This equation is a modification of the original Verhulst model:

 

 

This is the logistic growth curve and it is calculated with:

 

where

  is the natural logarithm base (also known as Euler's number),
  is the  value of the sigmoid's midpoint,
  is the curve's maximum value,
  is the logistic growth rate or steepness of the curve  and
 

The logistic growth curve depicts how population growth rate and carrying capacity are inter-connected. As illustrated in the logistic growth curve model, when the population size is small, the population increases exponentially.

What determines a specific system's carrying capacity involves a limiting factor; this may be available supplies of food or water, nesting areas, space, or the amount of waste that can be absorbed without degrading the environment and decreasing carrying capacity.

Software is available to help calculate the carrying capacity of a given natural environment.

Population ecology 

Carrying capacity is a commonly used concept for biologists when trying to better understand biological populations and the factors which affect them. When addressing biological populations, carrying capacity can be seen as a stable dynamic equilibrium, taking into account extinction and colonization rates. In population biology, logistic growth assumes that population size fluctuates above and below an equilibrium value.

Numerous authors have questioned the usefulness of the term when applied to actual wild populations. Although useful in theory and in laboratory experiments, carrying capacity as a method of measuring population limits in the environment is less useful as it sometimes oversimplifies the interactions between species.

Agriculture
It is important for farmers to calculate the carrying capacity of their land so they can establish a sustainable stocking rate.  For example, calculating the carrying capacity of a paddock in Australia is done in Dry Sheep Equivalents (DSEs). A single DSE is 50 kg Merino wether, dry ewe or non-pregnant ewe, which is maintained in a stable condition. Not only sheep are calculated in DSEs, the carrying capacity for other livestock is also calculated using this measure. A 200 kg weaned calf of a British style breed gaining 0.25 kg/day is 5.5DSE, but if the same weight of the same type of calf were gaining 0.75 kg/day, it would be measured at 8DSE. Cattle are not all the same, their DSEs can vary depending on breed, growth rates, weights, if it is a cow ('dam'), steer or ox ('bullock' in Australia), and if it weaning, pregnant or 'wet' (i.e. lactating). 

In other parts of the world different units are used for calculating carrying capacities. In the United Kingdom the paddock is measured in LU, livestock units, although different schemes exist for this. New Zealand uses either LU, EE (ewe equivalents) or SU (stock units). In the USA and Canada the traditional system uses animal units (AU). A French/Swiss unit is Unité de Gros Bétail (UGB).

In some European countries such as Switzerland the pasture (alm or alp) is traditionally measured in Stoß, with one Stoß equaling four Füße (feet). A more modern European system is Großvieheinheit (GV or GVE), corresponding to 500 kg in liveweight of cattle. In extensive agriculture 2 GV/ha is a common stocking rate, in intensive agriculture, when grazing is supplemented with extra fodder, rates can be 5 to 10 GV/ha. In Europe average stocking rates vary depending on the country, in 2000 the Netherlands and Belgium had a very high rate of 3.82 GV/ha and 3.19 GV/ha respectively, surrounding countries have rates of around 1 to 1.5 GV/ha, and more southern European countries have lower rates, with Spain having the lowest rate of 0.44 GV/ha. 

This system can also be applied to natural areas. Grazing megaherbivores at roughly 1 GV/ha is considered sustainable in central European grasslands, although this varies widely depending on many factors. In ecology it is theoretically (i.e. cyclic succession, patch dynamics, Megaherbivorenhypothese) taken that a grazing pressure of 0.3 GV/ha by wildlife is enough to hinder afforestation in a natural area. Because different species have different ecological niches, with horses for example grazing short grass, cattle longer grass, and goats or deer preferring to browse shrubs, niche differentiation allows a terrain to have slightly higher carrying capacity for a mixed group of species, than it would if there were only one species involved.

Some niche market schemes mandate lower stocking rates than can maximally be grazed on a pasture. In order to market ones' meat products as 'biodynamic', a lower Großvieheinheit of 1 to 1.5 (2.0) GV/ha is mandated, with some farms having an operating structure using only 0.5 to 0.8 GV/ha.

The Food and Agriculture Organization has introduced three international units to measure carrying capacity: FAO Livestock Units for North America, FAO Livestock Units for sub-Saharan Africa, and Tropical Livestock Units.

Another rougher and less precise method of determining the carrying capacity of a paddock is simply by looking objectively at the condition of the herd. In Australia, the national standardized system for rating livestock conditions is done by body condition scoring (BCS). An animal in a very poor condition is scored with a BCS of 0, and an animal which is extremely healthy is scored at 5: animals may be scored between these two numbers in increments of 0.25. At least 25 animals of the same type must be scored to provide a statistically representative number, and scoring must take place monthly -if the average falls, this may be due to a stocking rate above the paddock's carrying capacity or too little fodder. This method is less direct for determining stocking rates than looking at the pasture itself, because the changes in the condition of the stock may lag behind changes in the condition of the pasture.

Fisheries

In fisheries, carrying capacity is used in the formulae to calculate sustainable yields for fisheries management. The maximum sustainable yield (MSY) is defined as "the highest average catch that can be continuously taken from an exploited population (=stock) under average environmental conditions". MSY was originally calculated as half of the carrying capacity, but has been refined over the years, now being seen as roughly 30% of the population, depending on the species or population. Because the population of a species which is brought below its carrying capacity due to fishing will find itself in the exponential phase of growth, as seen in the Verhulst model, the harvesting of an amount of fish at or below MSY is a surplus yield which can be sustainably harvested without reducing population size at equilibrium, keeping the population at its maximum recruitment. However, annual fishing can be seen as a modification of r in the equation -i.e. the environment has been modified, which means that the population size at equilibrium with annual fishing is slightly below what K would be without it. 

Note that mathematically and in practical terms, MSY is problematic. If mistakes are made and even a tiny amount of fish are harvested each year above the MSY, populations dynamics imply that the total population will eventually decrease to zero. The actual carrying capacity of the environment may fluctuate in the real world, which means that practically, MSY may actually vary from year to year (annual sustainable yields and maximum average yield attempt to take this into account). Other similar concepts are optimum sustainable yield and maximum economic yield; these are both harvest rates below MSY.

These calculations are used to determine fishing quotas.

Humans 

Human carrying capacity is a function of how people live and the technology at their disposal. The two great economic revolutions that marked human history up to 1900—the agricultural and industrial revolutions—greatly ramped up Earth’s human carrying capacity, from 5 to 10 million people 10,000 BCE to 1.5 billion in 1900. The immense technological improvements of the past 100 years—in applied chemistry, physics, computing, genetic engineering, and more—have further increased Earth’s human carrying capacity, at least in the short term. Without the Haber-Bosch process for fixing nitrogen, modern agriculture could not support 8 billion people. Without the Green Revolution of the 1950s and 60s, famine might have culled large numbers of people in poorer countries during the last three decades of the twentieth century.

Recent technological successes, however, have come at grave environmental costs. Climate change, ocean acidification, and the huge dead zones at the mouths of many of world’s great rivers, are a function of the scale of contemporary agriculture and the many other demands 8 billion people make on the planet. Scientists now speak of humanity exceeding or threatening to exceed 9 planetary boundaries for safe use of the biosphere. Humanity’s unprecedented ecological impacts threaten to degrade the ecosystem services that people and the rest of life depend on—potentially decreasing Earth’s human carrying capacity. The signs that we have crossed this threshold are increasing.   

The fact that degrading Earth’s essential services is obviously possible, and happening in some cases, suggests that 8 billion people may be above Earth’s human carrying capacity. But human carrying capacity is always a function of a certain number of people living a certain way. This was encapsulated by Paul Ehrlich and James Holdren’s (1972) IPAT equation: environmental impact (I) = population (P) x affluence (A) x the technologies used to accommodate human demands (T). IPAT has found spectacular confirmation in recent decades within climate science, where the Kaya identity for explaining changes in CO2 emissions is essentially IPAT with two technology factors broken out for ease of use.

This suggests to technological optimists that new technological discoveries (or the deployment of existing ones) could continue to increase Earth’s human carrying capacity, as it has in the past. Yet technology has unexpected side effects, as we have seen with stratospheric ozone depletion, excessive nitrogen deposition in the world’s rivers and bays, and global climate change. This suggests that 8 billion people may be sustainable for a few generations, but not over the long term, and the term ‘carrying capacity’ implies a population that is sustainable indefinitely. It is possible, too, that efforts to anticipate and manage the impacts of powerful new technologies, or to divide up the efforts needed to keep global ecological impacts within sustainable bounds among more than 200 nations all pursuing their own self-interest, may prove too complicated to achieve over the long haul.

Two things can be confidently asserted regarding Earth’s carrying capacity, based on the Great Acceleration of energy and materials use, waste generation, and ecological degradation post-WW II. First, expansions in human carrying capacity have come at the expense of many other species occupying Earth today. Between 1970 and today, populations of wild vertebrates have declined 60%;  similarly sharp declines may have occurred among insects and vascular plants, although the evidence is sketchier. So our successful efforts to increase human carrying capacity have come at the expense of Earth’s capacity to sustain other species. As we have converted habitat and resources to our own use, other species have sharply declined—to the extent that conservation biologists speak of an incipient mass species extinction.

Second, expansions in per capita wealth and the concomitant increases in per capita consumption, resource use and waste generation, tend to decrease the total number of people that can be sustained, long term. All else being equal, a richer population, living more luxuriously, has a lower carrying capacity than a poorer, more abstemious population. As affluence goes up, population must come down to remain within any theoretical carrying capacity, and vice versa.

See also
 Tourism carrying capacity
 Inflection point
 Overpopulation in wild animals
 Overshoot (population)
 Population ecology
 Population growth
 r/K selection theory
 Toxic capacity
 ecological footprint and biocapacity

Further reading
Kin, Cheng Sok, et al. "Predicting Earth's Carrying Capacity of Human Population as the Predator and the Natural Resources as the Prey in the Modified Lotka-Volterra Equations with Time-dependent Parameters." arXiv preprint arXiv:1904.05002 (2019).

References

Demographics indicators
Ecological metrics
Population ecology
Economic geography
Ecological economics
Environmental terminology